KRNB lects (or Kamtapuri, Rajbanshi and Northern Bangla lects) are a cluster of modern lects that are phylogenetic descendants of the proto-Kamata language. The proto-Kamata language began differentiating after 1250 around Kamatapur, the capital city of Kamata kingdom, as the western branch of the proto-Kamarupa, whereas the eastern branch developed into proto-Assamese. Since the 16th century the proto-Kamta community has fragmented giving rise to the differentiated modern lects.  The modern lects are: Kamta (West Bengal), Rangpuri (Bangladesh), Rajbanshi (Nepal) and Surjapuri (Bihar).

These modern lects could be categorised into three groups: western, central and eastern. Unlike the Assamese, Bengali, Hindi and Nepali languages which were standardised and propagated in the 19th and 20th centuries, the KRNB lects were not standardised. As a result, the KRNB lects became diglossic vernaculars to these standard varieties and acquired phonological and morphological features from them.

Nevertheless, two standards are emerging within the KRNB lects: a central Jhapa variety targeting speakers in Nepal, and an eastern Cooch Behar variety targeting speakers in northern West Bengal and western Assam.

Proto Kamta
The development of proto-Kamta was the result of Sandhya, a ruler of Kamarupa Nagara (North Guwahati), Kamrup moving his capital to Kamatapur and establishing the Kamata kingdom, thus carrying the native language along with.

Socio-linguistic communities
The modern KRNB lects are spoken primarily in western Assam, northern West Bengal, northern Bangladesh, north-eastern Bihar and south-eastern Nepal.

Notes

References

 

Eastern Indo-Aryan languages